Slub or SLUB may refer to:

 Ślub, a play by Polish writer Witold Gombrowicz
 Slub (band),  a computer music group formed in 2000
 Slub (in textiles), a thick spot in a fiber
 Slub (knitting), a thick spot in a yarn created by varying the tightness of the twist
 Saxon State Library, in Dresden, Germany
 SLUB (software), one of the three memory handlers in the Linux kernel

See also 

 Slab (disambiguation)
 SLOB
 Stub (disambiguation)